Domingo Padilla, (born September 11, 1970) better known as Domingo, is an American hip hop producer from Brooklyn, New York of Latino descent. He has produced for some well-known hip hop artists such as Das EFX, Immortal Technique, and Rakim, among others. He is closely associated with Kool G Rap.

History 
Domingo, is a producer from Brooklyn New York of Latin origin. He has produced for some of hip hop's most respected and well-known artists such as Big Pun, Fat Joe, Krs One, Rakim, Big Daddy Kane and many more. He is also closely associated with Kool G Rap.

Domingo is one of the most prominent Hip Hop producers to ever come from East New York, Brooklyn. He has been producing professionally since the age of 17 when hip hop legend/producer Marley Marl took him under his production company “The House of Hits” and mentored Domingo to be who he is today.

In 1997 with the release of the critically acclaimed KRS-One album I Got Next, Domingo accomplished the accolades of gaining his first Gold record from the successful sales of the album. The album went on to sell well over 650,000 copies worldwide.

In 1998 Domingo had a further accomplishment of gaining his first Platinum record from the sales on the Big Pun Capital Punishment album. In the same year Domingo was nominated for both American and Latin Grammys for his production work on the Big Pun album. This classic album sold 2.3 Million copies worldwide.

Domingo released his first proper studio album in 1999, titled Behind The Doors Of The 13th Floor. The album featured Eminem, KRS-One, MC Shan and others.

In the year 2003 Domingo released his 2nd album The Difference. That album featured the likes of The Beatnuts, Dilated Peoples, High N Mighty and others. The Difference had the Domingo produced song by Krs One entitled Clear Em Out which sparked the "beef" between Krs One and St Louis rapper Nelly.

In 2007 Domingo released his 3rd studio album The Most Underrated. It features Big Daddy Kane, Joell Ortiz, Canibus, Termanology, Immortal Technique, The Beatnuts, Kool G Rap, Brother Ali, and others.

Domingo resurfaced with a new album in 2014 entitled Same Game New Rules, The album features Kool G Rap, KRS-One, R.A. the Rugged Man, Sean Price, M.O.P., Prodigy, Chris Rivers (Big Pun's son), Hell Razah, Ras Kass, AZ, Necro, Action Bronson, Sadat X, Rahzel and more.

Also in December 2014 Domingo released an Ep dedicated to the memory of rapper Big Pun entitled Bronx Legends Never Die. The Ep was highly regarded as a classic ep.

In 2015 it was a busy year for Domingo as he took the reins as a promoter and created the company That's Hip Hop LLC and put on 2 sold out concerts in the city of Pittsburgh, PA.

He also won an ASCAP Rhythm & Blues award for his participation in the Drake song All Me.

In October 2015 Domingo went and got Brooklyn rapper Joell Ortiz to do an album that was released thru That's Hip Hop in first quarter 2016.

In 2017 Domingo kept Hip Hop alive by releasing albums from Chris Rivers the son of Big Pun entitled "Delorean". He also released an album from Denzil Porter "Semantics Of Mr. Porter and Whispers "Whismonoxide" making his imprint That's Hip Hop LLC and ThatsHipHopMusic.com a household name.

Discography

Solo albums
Behind The Doors Of The 13th Floor (1999)
The Difference (2003)
The Most Underrated (2007)
Same Game New Rules (2014)

Compilations
Silencio=Muerte: Red Hot + Latin - AIDS Awareness: "Padre Nuestro" (1996)
Domingo Presents—Behind the Doors of the 13th Floor compilation (1999)
Oz (soundtrack) - "OZ Theme 2001 (f/ Kool G Rap, Lord Jamar, and Talib Kweli)" (2001)
Official Jointz—The Difference Vol.1 compilation (2002)
Para Mi Gente—Estamos Unidos (2003)
La Etnia— 5-27 Internacional (2016)

Production
Three 6 Mafia - Adventures in Hollyhood - score music Mtv
Amy Winehouse - Stronger Then Me (Remix)
Angie Martinez - "Suavamente (f/ Wyclef Jean)"
Bamboo - "Not The Ones To Sleep," "My Right Hand," "From The Get Up," 
Bernie Mac - TV Show [Soundtrack] 
Big Ben - "Unfinished Business"
Big Daddy Kane - "Flame On" 
Big Punisher - "The Dream Shatterer"
Blahzay Blahzay "Danger" (Executive Production)
Boogiemonsters: "Beginning of the End","Behold The Pale Horse," "Whoever You Are"
Bone Thugs N Harmony : "1st Of The Month (Remix)"
Canibus: "Pine Comb Poem", "All Clap (Original) (Feat. Domingo)"
Channel Live: "Maintain","Live For Hip-Hop","360","Rethink, Replan Refine","Illegal Broadcasters," "Spark Dat (f/ Benny Boom & Truck Turner)"
Chords - "Days Chasing Days (f/ Tonedeff)," "Searching For Dreams"
Chubb Rock - "East vs West"
Cocoa Brovaz - "Play No Games" 
Craig G - "Do It Again" 
Craig Mack - "The HA HA HA," "On Da Run"
CunninLynguists - "Southernunderground (title song)" 
Das EFX - "If U Luv"
Deacon The Villain - "Next To Die" 
Dhark Citi - "Petrified" 
Dilated Peoples - "Certified Official"
DJ JS-1 - "Essentials (f/KRS & Rahzel)"
Eminem - "Hustlers & Hardcore (f/Feel-X)"
Fat Cat Kareem - "Money Game"
Fat Joe - "Success","Part Deux","Say Word", "Dedication"
Feel X - "One Time (f/ J. Getm)"
First Platoon - "Bodega","Knockin At My Door"
Full Nelson - "Candela (f/ SU)," "Toma Lo Que Tengo,"
Funkmaster Flex Vol.3 - "KRS Freestyle"
Game Over 2 - Various Artists LP.
Godsons - "718","Sunday Morning," "Bacardi & Smoke," "Official," "Watch What You Say"
Guru - "Major Game"
Guatauva - Hip-Hop Side of self-titled LP,
The High & Mighty - "Rumble"
Hurricane G - songs from All Woman
I-BORN - "Uncle & Nephew","Me & You"
Immortal Technique - "Internally Bleeding," "Sierra Maestra"
Infamous Mobb - "Mobb Niggaz (f/ Prodigy)" 
Kid Frost - "East Side Rendezvous (RMX)"
K-Slash - "Blow It Up, Shut It Down" 
Kool G. Rap - "Take A Loss," "Sex, Money, Drugs," "My Life (f/ CNN)", "Men At Work 2020 (Feat. Ras Kass, Marley Marl, Action Bronson, Necro, Nusto, R.I., F.T., & Rugged Intellect)"
KRS-One - songs from Keep Right, The MC and Spiritual Minded
Lady Red: "Dona Roja","Talk Game","Me & You," "New York, New York"
Lord Tariq & Peter Gunz - "UNTITLED" (UNRELEASED)
Main One - "Bring The Drama," "El Gran Combo," "4 My Shorties"
Maniac Men - "Mecca"
Masta Ace - "No Regrets", "Dear Diary", "The Type I Hate", "Alphabet Soup"
Mecca - "Beastin"
Mexicano 777 - Songs from God's Assassins
Nature - "Can I Get Some Pussy?"
Non Phixion - "Caught Between Worlds"
Okwerdz - "Time For A Change"
PackFM - "The Fuck," "I Can't Win", "Ignorance Is Bliss (f/ Apathy & Deacon)", "Nasty", "Take our Place" (f/ Dominion), "Here We Go (Come On)"
Papoose - "Untitled"
Paula Perry - "Fort Knox"
Pizon - "Homegirls"
Punch & Words - "Native New Yorker"
QN5 Allstars - "Slogans" 
Rakim - "Watch This," "Bring It On"
Random - "Rock and Roll"
Ras Kass - "Got You Too Hot (f/ Diezel Don & Hurricane G)", "Me & My Twins '05 (Feat. Ras & Taj)", "Life/Time (Dead Doves) (Feat. Roscoe, Jay Rock, BLKdiamond, Lil Boo (Zoo Gang), & Taje)", "Men At Work 2020 (Feat. Kool G Rap, Marley Marl, Action Bronson, Necro, Nusto, R.I., F.T., & Rugged Intellect)", "So Sick (Feat. Stress1)"
Rahzel - "How Many Times (f/ Keith Murray & Lord Tariq)" 
Rise - "From A Child To The MC"
Royal Flush - "Double Up (f/ Big L & Kool G. Rap)," "Do It"
Rugged Intellect - "Say Goodbye," "By Any Means," "By Any Means Part II," "Emancipation," "Old School (Remix)," "Rep My Name," "Gonna Move," "Say Goodbye Remix (f/ Party Arty, Sean Price, Ruste Juxx & Solomon Childs," "State of the Art (f/ Sean Price)," and "Next Dose (f/ Ras Kass)"
Saul Abraham - "Same Old Hood" (feat. St. Laz, Kool G Rap, Hanouneh)
Sean Price (aka Ruck) - "Irrationally Speaking"
Session - "Soulcrush," "The MC 2003"
Shaquille O'Neal - "Best To Worst","Edge of Night"
Sinz of Reality - "Sinz of Reality"
Solo For Dolo - "Crown Royal" "Intro" "Go Ask Alice" "Wake Up" "Just Be" "Uprise"
Supastition - "It's Over Now"
THOR-EL - "Who R U Frontin 4?", "T.O.P," "Is You Is," "Patiently"
Tomorrowz Weaponz - "Que Que?," "Para Que Sepan"
Tonedeff - "Spanish Song," "Heads Up", "Ridiculous", "Loyal (original)", "Hypocrite," "Case Closed," "Give A Damn"
Tony Touch - "Trouble On The West Side Highway (f/ Slick Rick)"
Tony Yayo - "Homicide"
Truck Turner - "Truck Turner", "5 Deadly Games"
Wolfpack - Omar Epps+G Sharp: Full LP [UNRELEASED]
The Nicewun JM - "Ain’t Playin’ No More", "Pray Everyday", “Passion”

References

External links 
 Biography, credits, discography at Hip Hop Underground
 2009 interview, at kevinnottingham.com

Living people
American hip hop record producers
1970 births